KYYX (97.1 FM) is a country music radio station in Minot, North Dakota, owned by iHeartMedia, Inc. The call sign "KYYX" is pronounced as "kicks" and the station's nickname is "97 Kicks FM".

iHeartMedia, Inc. also owns and operates KCJB 910 (Country/Talk), KRRZ 1390 (Classic Hits/Talk), KIZZ 93.7 (Top 40), KMXA-FM 99.9 (AC), and KZPR 105.3 (Mainstream Rock) in Minot.

Previous KYYX stations
This radio station is not the first with the call letters KYYX.  The original KYYX operated as a new wave-themed radio station in Seattle, Washington, in the early 1980s.  A country radio station in Las Vegas, Nevada, operated as KYYX from 1985 to 1987 before going off the air and changing its call letters.

References

External links
97 Kicks FM website

KYYX/KJET - Memories of two GREAT Seattle stations in the 80s

YYX
Country radio stations in the United States
Radio stations established in 1966
IHeartMedia radio stations